NCAA Football 06 is a collegiate American football video game which was released on July 11, 2005. It is the successor to NCAA Football 2005 in the NCAA Football series. The product features former Michigan Wolverines standout and Heisman Trophy winner Desmond Howard on the cover. He is the only cover athlete not to have played the year before their respective game; Howard last played at Michigan in 1991. It is the only game in the series as of 2013 to have a music soundtrack, as the other games play school fight songs and general band pieces, and the last game in the series to feature Division I FCS teams on all platforms. NCAA Football 06 is the first game in the NCAA Football series to shorten the year to the last 2 digits.

Gameplay
NCAA Football 06 features a new game mode, "Race for the Heisman". In "Race for the Heisman", you begin as a high school standout hoping to sign with a major college program. After choosing your position and your position-specific drill, you are offered three scholarships, or you can walk on to a school of your choice. The prestige of the offering schools depends on how you performed in your drill.

Another new feature in NCAA Football 06 is the Impact Player. Each team has three impact players, usually the three highest-rated players on the roster, but there is always at least one impact player on offense and on defense. (In Dynasty mode some teams only have two Impact Players in later years, but a third is named later in the season. Impact players will also change based on performance or lack thereof.) Some teams' kickers or punters are impact players, too. Offensive linemen are never impact players in the game. Impact players are called upon to make big plays when "in the zone" (indicated by their white impact icon underneath them pulsating). If they execute a big play, action pauses and the camera zooms in on the tackle, juke move, etc.

Retained from the previous version are the Top 25 toughest places to play (The University of Florida's Ben Hill Griffin Stadium, or "The Swamp", remains #1 in 06), a still-revamped Dynasty Mode (with a new In-Season Recruiting feature), all-time and historic teams, Create-a-School, and much more.

Featured players
The main menu screen features a highlight reel with footage of plays made by some of the most famous players in college football history, including Ricky Williams, Bo Jackson, Archie Griffin, Charles Woodson, Herschel Walker, LaDainian Tomlinson, Barry Sanders, LaVar Arrington, Warren Sapp, Ray Lewis, Tim Dwight, Randy Moss, Ron Dayne, Warrick Dunn, Lawrence Taylor, Tim Brown, and Peyton Manning.

Development

Like Madden NFL 06, which has an exclusive license with the NFL, EA has an exclusive license with the NCAA to use stadiums, logos, and team nicknames. According to NCAA Football (a not-for-profit corporation serving to represent various stakeholders for college football), the "EA Sports video football game generates more than $8 million in royalties for NCAA Football and its members." Also, player names are not available in the game because the NCAA would have to pay the players for naming rights so they are called by their positions and numbers, but the player can still give them names.

Music
Prior to the release of NCAA Football 06, the only music featured in the game were fight songs of several major colleges. These would play at random, however, the user-selected "favorite team" would always have their fight song played first whenever the game was first started.  NCAA Football 06 was the first and last to include licensed music to keep the series in uniform with other EA Sports releases such as Madden NFL and the NHL series.  This format was dropped for NCAA Football 07, with the soundtrack returning to college fight songs.  However, it was possible to turn off the licensed music and listen to the fight songs in NCAA Football 06. The music features mainly college rock, punk and post-punk selections, including Bad Religion, The Clash, NOFX and The Mr. T Experience. It is the first NCAA game to feature the option of non-fight songs in the menus.

Release
Upon its release, NCAA Football 06 was the best-selling video game for July 2005, occupying both the number 1 and number 2 spots corresponding to the PlayStation 2 and Xbox versions respectively.

Reception

By July 2006, the PlayStation 2 version of NCAA Football 06 had sold 1.2 million copies and earned $56 million in the United States. Next Generation ranked it as the 40th highest-selling game launched for the PlayStation 2, Xbox or GameCube between January 2000 and July 2006 in that country. Combined sales of NCAA Football console games reached 7 million units in the United States by July 2006.

The game still ranks among the best game of the series, It also was met with positive reception on release.  GameRankings and Metacritic gave it a score of 87.68% and 87 out of 100 for the Xbox version, and 87.42% and 87 out of 100 for the PlayStation 2 version.

References

External links

2005 video games
PlayStation 2 games
Xbox games
College football video games
Electronic Arts games
EA Sports games
North America-exclusive video games
NCAA video games
Video games developed in the United States
Multiplayer and single-player video games